Sauto is a commune in the Pyrénées-Orientales department in southern France. It is reached by the TER Occitanie, which serves the station of Gare de Sauto.

Geography 
Sauto is located in the canton of Les Pyrénées catalanes and in the arrondissement of Prades.

Population 

The inhabitants of the commune are known as Sautonins or Saltunats.

See also
Communes of the Pyrénées-Orientales department

References

Communes of Pyrénées-Orientales